Counting from the first election that was held since the 2007 municipal reform, all elections had resulted in the Social Democrats winning the mayor's position. 

In the 2017 election, the Social Democrats had become the largest party with 10 seats. They would also secure the mayor's position for a third term  

In this election, the Conservatives would for the first time in their history become the largest blue party of a municipal election in the municipality. However, Thomas Lykke Pedersen from the Social Democrats, incumbent mayor, managed to secure a 4th term with support of the red bloc parties.

Electoral system
For elections to Danish municipalities, a number varying from 9 to 31 are chosen to be elected to the municipal council. The seats are then allocated using the D'Hondt method and a closed list proportional representation.
Fredensborg Municipality had 27 seats in 2021

Unlike in Danish General Elections, in elections to municipal councils, electoral alliances are allowed.

Electoral alliances  

Electoral Alliance 1

Electoral Alliance 2

Results

Notes

References 

Fredensborg